Viveka Babajee (27 May 1973 – 25 June 2010) was a Mauritian model and actress. She held the titles of Miss Mauritius World 1993 and Miss Mauritius Universe 1994. She was best known for her KamaSutra condom advertisements in the 1990s, and for her involvement in the so-called "Manila Film Festival" scam of 1994.

Babajee was found hanging from the ceiling fan in her apartment on 25 June 2010, at her Bandra residence in Mumbai. The police reports stated that she committed suicide due to depression.

Early life
The youngest of four sisters, Babajee was born in Port Louis, Mauritius on 27 May 1973. Her mother is Maharashtrian and was born in Hyderabad. Babajee moved to India in the mid-1990s.

Career
Babajee achieved success in India with KamaSutra condoms commercials. She also participated in music videos for Daler Mehndi's "Boom Boom", Harbhajan Mann's "Hai Meri Billo" and Abbey's "Phir Se". In 2009, her company, Cream Events, achieved success with the help of her ex-boyfriend and business partner, Kartik Jobanputra. She later broke all ties with Cream Events.

As a model, Babajee walked the ramp for top designers including Ritu Kumar, Ritu Beri, Abu Jani and Sandeep Khosla, Rohit Bal, Suneet Varma, JJ Valaya, Tarun Tahiliani, and many others. In January 2010, she started her own event management business and managed projects like the Arjun Khanna show by Taj Colaba.  Her company was named "VIBGYOR ENT" (Lifestyle and Boutik Events). VIBGYOR is an acronym for the seven colors of the rainbow (Violet, Indigo, Blue, Green, Yellow, Orange & Red).

Viveka Babajee had been an anchor for FTV India. She made her debut film appearance in Yeh Kaisi Mohabbat, co-starring with Deeksha and Krishna, released in 2002. Even though the movie did poorly at the box office, Babajee's performance did not go unnoticed.

Death
She was found hanging from the ceiling fan in her apartment on 25 June 2010, at her Bandra residence in Mumbai. The police reports stated that Babajee committed suicide due to depression. The last entry in her diary, which was found next to her body, said, "you killed me, Gautam Vohra,"  and unconfirmed reports stated that she became depressed after separating from her boyfriend, Gautam Vora. However, in 2012, the case was re-opened by police after Gautam Vohra was arrested in connection with a murder case.

Filmography

See also
List of people who died by hanging

References

External links

 Viveka Babajee in List of Mauritian models

1973 births
2010 deaths
People from Port Louis District
Mauritian emigrants to India
Mauritian expatriates in India
Expatriate actresses in India
Actresses from Mumbai
People from Bandra
Businesspeople from Mumbai
Female models from Mumbai
Female suicides
Mauritian beauty pageant winners
Mauritian businesspeople
Mauritian actresses
Mauritian female models
Mauritian people of Indian descent
Mauritian people of Marathi descent
Mauritian women in business
Actresses in Hindi cinema
Actresses of Indian descent
Female models of Indian descent
Miss Universe 1994 contestants
Miss World 1993 delegates
Suicides by hanging in India
2010 suicides
20th-century Mauritian people
21st-century Mauritian people
Artists who committed suicide